Hywel ap Ieuaf (died 985) was a King of Gwynedd in north-west Wales from 979 to 985.

Hywel was the son of Ieuaf ap Idwal who had ruled Gwynedd jointly with his brother Iago ab Idwal until 969. In that year the sons of Idwal quarrelled and Iago took Ieuaf prisoner. Hywel is first recorded as accompanying Iago to Chester to meet King Edgar of England in 973, when together with a number of other kings including the kings of Scotland and of Strathclyde he pledged that he would be the king's henchman on sea and land. Later chroniclers made the kings into eight, all plying the oars of Edgar's state barge on the River Dee.

In 974 Hywel raised an army and drove his uncle from Gwynedd temporarily. Iago was able to return, but was forced to share power with his nephew. In 978 Hywel made another attempt to take the kingdom from his uncle, raiding the monastery at Clynnog Fawr. In this raid Hywel was assisted by English troops, possibly provided by Aelfhere, Earl of Mercia. Hywel defeated Iago in battle in 979, and the same year Iago was captured by a force of Vikings, possibly in Hywel's pay, and vanished from the scene. Hywel was left as sole ruler of Gwynedd, but apparently did not set his father free, since according to J.E. Lloyd, Ieuaf remained in captivity until 988.

In 980 Hywel faced a challenge from Iago's son, Custennin ab Iago, who attacked Anglesey in alliance with Gofraid mac Arailt, a Viking chief from the Isle of Man. Hywel defeated them in battle, killing Custennin and putting Gofraid and his men to flight. Now securely in possession of Gwynedd, Hywel aimed to expand his kingdom to the south. He again made an alliance with Aelfhere of Mercia and attacked Brycheiniog and Morgannwg with some success, although he was not able to annex these kingdoms. However, in 985 his English allies turned on him and killed him, possibly alarmed by his growing power. He was succeeded by his brother Cadwallon ap Ieuaf, who had not been on the throne long when Gwynedd was annexed by Maredudd ap Owain of Deheubarth.

References

985 deaths
Monarchs of Gwynedd
10th-century Welsh monarchs
Year of birth unknown